The Party of Humanists  is a minor political party in Germany that first participated in the 2017 federal election.

Party platform
The underlying ideology is evolutionary humanism. The core themes of the Humanist Party are science and education, the right of self-determination of the individual, and secularization. For example, the party supports the liberal and self-responsible use of drugs, supports legal voluntary euthanasia and is against circumcision of children. The party also supports the implementation of universal basic income.

Currently, the Party of Humanists is the only party in Germany that specifically targets non-religious people, freethinkers, and atheists as voters.

Programme

Health and science 

 Compulsary health insurance should only cover evidence based medicine, not pseudomedicine such as homeopathy
 Legalization of active euthanasia under specific circumstances
 Legalization of all drugs, but only for adults and with more prevention measures such as education, drug-checking, regulated production and sale
 Openness towards new technology and impartial assessment of the harms benefits, e. g. with respect to genome editing and stem cell research
 Reduction of antibiotic use in livestock farming in order to avoid emerging resistances
 Funding for in-vitro-meat research

EU and military 

 Founding of a united European Federal Republic. Today’s national states shall be converted into strong sovereign regions.
 Rejection of a compulsory military service year for young adults
 Establishing a united European military

Economy 

 Simplification of the tax system by eliminating exemptions as well as cutback on unnecessary subsidies
 Deregulation of shop opening hours on sundays
 Trialing and implementation of universal basic income

Climate 

 Stopping the nuclear energy phase-out in Germany and utilization of new reactor types to combat climate change

Social topics 

 Legalization of surrogate motherhood
 Legalization of sex work, modeling after New Zealand
 Legalization of abortion regardless of gestation age, modeling after Canadian abortion laws

Freedom of speech and the Internet 

 Repeal of upload-filters and protection of net-neutrality

Religion 

 Complete separation of church and state
 Introduction of unified ethics education instead of compulsory religious education in schools
 Removing references to god from the constitution and other laws
 Prohibition of medically not-indicated religious circumcision in children unable to consent

History 
The party emerged from a Facebook group called "Initiative Humanismus" with over 700 members. One year after the decision to establish a party, the Party of Humanists was founded on 4 October 2014 in Berlin. On 21 March 2017, the Party held a joint press conference along with the Pirate Party Germany, the Liberal Democrats, the New Liberals, the Transhuman Party Germany, and the youth organization of The Left to announce a "socialliberale proclamation" and better cooperation among the participating organizations.

Leadership
The current federal executive committee of the Party of Humanists consists of eleven members:

 Andreas Schäfer (Party Leader) 
 Dominic Ressel (General Secretary) 
 Stephan Wiedenmann (Treasurer) 
 Axel Börold
 Tim Büning
 Richard Gebauer
 David Kaufmann
 Maria Krause
 Sonja Marschke
 Alexander Mucha
 Vincent Weber

Federal state parties

References

External links
 Offizielle Website der Partei der Humanisten (Official website of the Party German)
 Leitbild der Partei der Humanisten (Mission Statement of the Party German, English, Esperanto)
 Grundsatzprogramm der Partei der Humanisten (Principle program of the Party German)

Liberal parties in Germany
2014 establishments in Germany
Political parties established in 2014
Euthanasia in Germany
Humanist Party
Irreligion in Germany
Pro-European political parties in Germany
Progressive parties
Secular humanism
Secularism in Germany
Social liberal parties
Universal basic income in Germany
Political parties supporting universal basic income